Andhari may refer to:

 Andhari, Siddhicharan, a village in Nepal
 Andhari, Vikramgad, a village in Maharashtra, India
 Andhari wildlife sanctuary in Maharashtra, India
 Andhari river flowing through Tadoba Andhari Tiger Project in Maharashtra, India